Sinners in Love is a 1928 silent film comedy directed by George Melford and starring Olive Borden and Seena Owen. It was produced and released by Film Booking Offices of America (FBO).

Cast
Olive Borden as Ann Hardy
Huntley Gordon as Ted Wells
Seena Owen as Yvonne D'Orsy
Ernest Hilliard as Silk Oliver
 Daphne Pollard as Mabel
Phillips Smalley as Spencer
Henry Roquemore as (uncredited)

Preservation status
The film survives at Bois du Arcy.

References

External links

American silent feature films
Films directed by George Melford
American black-and-white films
1928 comedy films
Silent American comedy films
Film Booking Offices of America films
1920s American films